The Slaughter of Innocence, a Requiem for the Mighty is the debut full-length album by British band Hecate Enthroned. It was released 15 May 1997, via Blackend Records, and was also their last release to feature Paul Massey on bass and Marc on guitars, and their first to feature long-time drummer Robert Kendrick.

Track listing

Personnel 
 Hecate Enthroned
 Jon Kennedy — vocals
 Marc — guitars
 Paul Massey — bass
 Michael Snell — keyboards, orchestral arrangements
 Rob Kendrick — drums, percussion
 Nigel Dennen — guitars, acoustic guitars

 Miscellaneous staff
 Tim Turan — mastering
 Simon Marsden — cover art
 Andy Sneap — production

Hecate Enthroned albums
1997 debut albums
Albums produced by Andy Sneap